Dryer  defined three different types of negative markers in language. Beside negative particles and negative affixes, negative verbs play a role in various languages. The negative verb is used to implement a clausal negation. The negative predicate counts as a semantic function and is localized and therefore grammaticalized in different languages. Negation verbs are often used as an auxiliary type which also carries φ-feature content. This could be visualized for example in the inflectional character of the negation verb while combined with the main verb. This is some sort of tendency by Dryer to place the negation verb before the finite verb. Miestamo researched four different types of negations and proposed a distinction between symmetric negation in which a negative marker is added and asymmetric negation in which beside the added negation marker, other structural changes appear.

English
In English a standard negation (SN) is used to negate declarative main clauses. The verbal negation predicate is 'not'. To negate other clauses, the negation construction differs from SN. The English auxiliary 'do', in combination with the negative verb, indicates whether one or multiple individuals are involved, while the verb referring to the negated activity remains non-inflected. Concluding this, ordinary verbs take the auxiliary do when negated by not.

Uralic languages
Uralic languages differ from each other in the particulars of negation predicate use but continue to show specific similarities. For defining different patterns of negation predicates it is necessary to know about the lexical verb (LV) and the finite form (FE). Miestamo defined four types of asymmetry in negation verbs. The first type shows a prominent appearance in Uralic languages. It is defined as A/Fin (A = asymmetry | Fin = finiteness) and describes that influenced by the negation verb, the finiteness of the LV is reduced or lost. For example, the LV loses the finiteness because the clause is marked by the de-verbalizing negative morpheme. Therefore, the copula is added as a type which holds the finite status (FE). In some uralic languages speaker produce connegatives to construct the syntactically acceptable word form used in negative clauses.

Finnish 
The standard negation (SN) in Finnish language is realized by a verbal complex. First the LV with a non-finite character is formed followed by the finite element which is presented as the negative auxiliary. The root of the auxiliary is 'e-'. The ending gives information about person and number. The marker for tense is not presented on the auxiliary and is only dependent from the clausal context. Therefore, tense is marked on the LV separated from the auxiliary and appears as connegative form in present tense and past participle in past tense.

Negative Verb - Overview for clausal negations 

Indicative, conditional, and potential

Imperative

Estonian
The Estonian language uses a particle-like non-inflectional negative auxiliary which is hierarchical presented on a pre-verbal slot. The auxiliary is realized as 'ei'. A special form differs from the SN while forming the connegative in the present tense, in the past form or the active past participle. Differing to other Uralic languages, in Estonian language the flectional character doesn't seem to be a necessary feature for the negative auxiliary. This is important because the question appears, if the auxiliary has to show a flectional marker even if the LV is not showing any flectional marker without using the negation modus.

Negative Verb - Strategies in clausal negations 

Indicative, conditional, and oblique

Imperative

Skolt Saami 
In Skolt Saami the SN shows a negative auxiliary compared with a non-finite LV. For imperative a special case is provided.

Negative Verb - Summary

South Saami 
In South Saami the SN is realized by a negative auxiliary. This form is used in present tense and the preterite. The LV is presented as a connegative form. A special case is presented while creating the imperative. In this case the negative auxiliary gets a full personal paradigm except for the third person 'dual'. The third person in singular in present tense of the negative auxiliary is prohibited as a negative reply.

Negative Verb - Strategies in clausal negations

Inari Sami
The negative verb is conjugated in moods and personal forms in Inari Sami.

Indicative, conditional, and potential mood

Imperative

Northern Sami
The negative verb is conjugated in moods and personal forms in Northern Sami.

Indicative, conditional, and potential mood

Imperative

Lule Sami
The negative verb is conjugated in moods and personal forms in Lule Sami.

Indicative, conditional, and potential mood

Hungarian 
Hungarian has lost most evidence of a negative verb, but the negation particle 'nem' becomes 'ne' before verbs in the jussive/imperative (also sometimes called the conditional mood, or J-mood). Furthermore, the 3rd person present indicative of the copular verb ('lenni') has unique negative forms 'nincs(en)' and 'nincsenek' as opposed to 'nem van' and 'nem vannak', but only when the particle and verb would occur adjacently. In all other instances the copular verb acts regularly. These forms are also unique in that they have an existential role "there is (not)" and "there are (not)". In the present indicative 3rd person, copular verbs are not used; rather the absence of a verb (with or without a negation particle) implies the copula.

Komi
In Komi language, the negative marker and the form of the negative construction is dependent of the clausal tense. If the corresponding affirmative predicate is based in a verbal form, a negative auxiliary is used. This is not convertible for affirmative verbs with nominal forms. The negative auxiliary is used in present tense, future tense, 1st past tense of indicative and in the imperative and optative mood.

Negative Verb - Strategies in clausal negations

Korean

Korean verbs can be negated by the negative verbs 않다 anta and 못하다 mothada or by the negative adverbs 안 an and 못 mot. The copula 이다 ida has a corresponding negative copula 아니다 anida.  (anida is an independent word like anta and mothada, unlike ida which cannot stand on its own and must be attached to a noun.)

References 

Verb types